The arterial resistivity index (also called as Resistance index, abbreviated as RI), developed by Léandre Pourcelot , is a measure of pulsatile blood flow that reflects the resistance to blood flow caused by microvascular bed distal to the site of measurement.

Calculation

The formula used to calculate resistance index is:

Description

The RI is altered not by vascular resistance alone but by the combination of vascular resistance and vascular compliance.

Normal mean renal artery RI for an adult is 0.6 with 0.7 the upper limit of normal. In children, RI commonly exceeds 0.7 through 12 months of age and can remain above 0.7 through 4 years of age.

Uses

Medical ultrasonography
It is used in ultrasound testing of umbilical artery for placental insufficiency. RI should not exceed 0.60 at 30 weeks of gestation. RI is also commonly used to monitor kidney status, especially following kidney transplant. Following kidney transplantation, patients with an RI > 0.8 have an increased mortality.

Medical laser Doppler imaging
Mapping of the local arterial resistivity index from laser Doppler imaging enables unambiguous identification of retinal arteries and veins on the basis of their systole-diastole variations, and reveal ocular hemodynamics in human eyes.

See also
 Pulsatility index
 Leandre Pourcelot (French)

References

Cardiovascular diseases
Medical tests
Medical ultrasonography